WDLJ (97.5 FM, "97.5 The Rock") is a radio station broadcasting a classic rock format. Licensed to Breese, Illinois, United States, the station is currently owned by KM Radio of Breese, LLC.

97.5 the Rock has been in existence since 2003.

References

External links

Classic rock radio stations in the United States
DLJ
Clinton County, Illinois